Piaski is a neighbourhood of Lututów, Poland, located in the western part of the town.

History
During the German occupation of Poland (World War II), in December 1941 and January 1942, the German gendarmerie carried out expulsions of Poles, who were placed in a transit camp in nearby Wieluń, and then deported either to the General Government in the more eastern part of German-occupied Poland or to forced labour in Germany, while their houses were handed over to German colonists as part of the Lebensraum policy.

References 

Neighbourhoods in Poland
Wieruszów County